Mehdi Azizian (born 20 January 1956) is an Iranian businessman and economist who was President and CEO of Astan Quds Razavi (AQR) from 1 March 2014 until 29 March 2016. He was previously Economic Vice President of the company.

Career
Mehdi Azizian, a civil engineer, is head of the Astan Quds Razavi (AQR) since 1988. He is also chairman of the Organization for Eghtesade Razavi, the largest financial holding company, the country's biggest in eastern part. AQR is one of the largest charitable foundation in Iran, "with huge holdings acquired through generations of donations" from devotees at the Imam Reza shrine and has revenues in billions of dollars. He also had a lot of input into the overall urban planning around the shrine, the architecture of the new elements (porches, porticoes, courts etc.) in the shrine of Imam Reza.

References

External links
Interview with CEO

1956 births
Living people
Ferdowsi University of Mashhad
Iranian chief executives
Iranian businesspeople